Heinrich Claß (February 29, 1868 – April 16, 1953) was a German right-wing politician, a Pan-Germanist, an anti-Semite and a "rabid racialist". He presided the Pan-German League from 1908 to 1939.

Early life

Claß was born in Alzey. His father was a notary. He studied law at the Humboldt University of Berlin, University of Freiburg and the University of Giessen up to 1891, when he became a legal trainee. In 1894, he settled in Mainz as a lawyer.

Political advocacy and involvement
In 1894, Claß was a founding member of the nationalist German Association, which propagated "pure Germanism" by excluding ethnic minorities.

In 1897, he became a member of the Pan-German League, where he was elected to the directorate in 1901. After becoming the president in 1908, he began to change the direction of the League to more radical positions.

He came into sharp conflict with Theobald von Bethmann Hollweg, especially during the Agadir Crisis in 1911, and the League showed its radical positions. From the "hereditary hostility" to France and a "moral inferiority" of England, Claß advocated a speedy war, which was to lead the German Reich to "world power" and territorial expansion.

Claß is commonly known for his books about far-right policy that were written under the pseudonym Daniel Frymann or Einhart. The most famous was his 1912 book Wenn ich der Kaiser wär (If I Were the Kaiser) in which he agitates for imperialism, Pan-Germanism and Anti-Semitism.

During World War I, Claß called for the annexion of Belgium. In 1917, he founded the German Fatherland Party with Alfred von Tirpitz and Wolfgang Kapp.

After 1918, Claß met Adolf Hitler and supported his putsch in 1923. In 1931, he was one of the founding members of the Harzburg Front. From 1933 to 1939, Claß was a member of the National Socialist Party in the Reichstag. It is noteworthy that his radical imperialism, pan-Germanism and anti-Semitism had a significant influence on the Nazis.

Later life
From 1943 to 1953, Claß lived with his daughter in Jena, where he died.

Works
 Bilanz eines neuen Kurses. – Berlin : Alldt. Verl., 1903
 (as Einhart): Deutsche Geschichte. – Leipzig : Diederich, 1909
 (as Daniel Frymann): Wenn ich der Kaiser wär': Politische Wahrheiten und Notwendigkeiten. – Leipzig : Dieterich, 1912 (from 1925 known as Das Kaiserbuch)
 West-Marokko deutsch!. – Munich : Lehmann, 1911
 Wider den Strom : vom Werden und Wachsen der nationalen Opposition im alten Reich. – Leipzig : Köhler, 1932
 Zum deutschen Kriegsziel. Eine Flugschrift. – Munich : Lehmann, 1917

References

Further reading

External links
Online version of Wenn ich Kaiser wär (English) 

1868 births
1953 deaths
Alldeutscher Verband members
German Fatherland Party politicians
19th-century German lawyers
German nationalists
Nazi Party politicians
Humboldt University of Berlin alumni
Members of the Reichstag of Nazi Germany
People from Alzey
People from Rhenish Hesse
University of Freiburg alumni
University of Giessen alumni
Jurists from Rhineland-Palatinate
20th-century German lawyers